Zand may refer to:

 Zend, a class of exegetical commentaries on Zoroastrian scripture
 Zand District, an administrative subdivision of Iran
 Zand Boulevard, in Shiraz, Iran
 Z And, a variable star
 Zand Bank, a digital bank in United Arab Emirates

As a tribal/clan and dynastic name
 Zand tribe, a former Lak tribe of western Iran, a member of which founded the Zand dynasty
 Zand dynasty (1773-1794), a dynasty that ruled southern and central Iran
 Karim Khan Zand (r. 1751-1779), founder of the Zand dynasty

As a surname
 Banafsheh Zand-Bonazzi (born 1961), Iranian writer, film producer and human rights activist
 Kayvon Zand, musician and NYC nightlife personality
 Lazlo Zand, fictional character from Robotech
 Nathalie Zand (1883–1942), Polish Jewish neurologist
 Nosson Zand (born 1981), Boston rapper
 Shlomo Zand (born 1946), more commonly spelled Shlomo Sand, Israeli professor
 Stephen Joseph Zand (1898–1963), engineer